Verrone is a comune (municipality) in the Province of Biella in the Italian region of Piedmont, located about  northeast of Turin and about  southeast of Biella.

Verrone borders the following municipalities: Benna, Candelo, Cerrione, Gaglianico, Massazza, Salussola, Sandigliano. Sights include the medieval castle (a complex of structures once owned by the Vialardi Ghibelline family), and the parish church of St. Lawrence, built from the 6th to the 10th century.

References

Cities and towns in Piedmont